1942 Academy Awards may refer to:

 14th Academy Awards, the Academy Awards ceremony that took place in 1942
 15th Academy Awards, the 1943 ceremony honoring the best in film for 1942